Courts of Wyoming include:
;State courts of Wyoming
Wyoming Supreme Court
Wyoming District Courts (9 districts)
Wyoming Circuit Courts

Federal courts located in Wyoming
 United States District Court for the District of Wyoming

References

External links
 National Center for State Courts – directory of state court websites.

Courts in the United States